Andre Maurice Keith Burley (born 22 August 1999) is a professional footballer who plays as a defender for Oxford City. Born in England, he represents Saint Kitts and Nevis internationally.

Club career
A youth product of Reading, Burley signed his first professional contract with the club on 2 July 2018. He made his professional debut with Reading in a 2–2 FA Cup tie with Blackpool on 4 January 2020. He signed on loan with the Irish club Waterford on 14 February 2020 for the remainder of the 2019–20 season. On 29 September 2020, Burley signed with Wycombe Wanderers. He moved to Hungerford Town on loan on 14 December 2020.  On 5 November 2021, it was announced that he had joined Maidenhead United on loan for the remainder of the season. His loan spell ended early and he returned to Wycombe on 17 January 2022, before re-joining Hungerford on loan later that month.

On 29 June 2022, Oxford City announced the signing of Burley.

International career
Burley was called up to represent the Saint Kitts and Nevis U20s for the 2018 CONCACAF U-20 Championship. He made his debut for Saint Kitts and Nevis national football team on 24 March 2021 in a World Cup qualifier against Puerto Rico.

Career statistics

Club

International

References

External links
 
 Wycombe Wanderers Profile

1999 births
Living people
Citizens of Saint Kitts and Nevis through descent
Saint Kitts and Nevis footballers
Association football defenders
Saint Kitts and Nevis international footballers
Saint Kitts and Nevis expatriate footballers
Expatriate association footballers in Ireland
Sportspeople from Slough
English footballers
Reading F.C. players
Waterford F.C. players
Wycombe Wanderers F.C. players
Hungerford Town F.C. players
Maidenhead United F.C. players
Oxford United F.C. players
League of Ireland players
National League (English football) players
English expatriate footballers
English expatriate sportspeople in Ireland
English people of Saint Kitts and Nevis descent
Footballers from Berkshire